The 1993 Akron Zips football team represented Akron University in the 1993 NCAA Division I-A football season as members of the Mid-American Conference. They were led by eighth–year head coach Gerry Faust. The Zips played their home games at the Rubber Bowl in Akron, Ohio. They finished the season with a record of 5–6, 4–4 in MAC play to finish in fifth place.

Schedule

References

Akron
Akron Zips football seasons
Akron Zips football